Eñaut Mendia Berasategui (born 25 June 1999), sometimes known as Eñaut Mendi or just Mendi, is a Spanish professional footballer who plays as a forward for CD Vitoria.

Club career
Born in Lazkao, Gipuzkoa, Basque Country, Mendi was a SD Beasain youth graduate. He made his first team debut during the 2017–18 season, in Tercera División.

In July 2019, Mendi moved to SD Eibar on a three-year contract, and was assigned to the reserves in Tercera División. He made his first team – and La Liga – debut on 3 October 2020, starting in a 2–1 away win against Real Valladolid.

References

External links
 
 
 

1999 births
Living people
People from Goierri
Sportspeople from Gipuzkoa
Spanish footballers
Footballers from the Basque Country (autonomous community)
Association football forwards
La Liga players
Tercera División players
Tercera Federación players
CD Vitoria footballers
SD Eibar footballers
SD Beasain footballers